There are at least 7 members of the order Urticales found in Montana. Some of these species are exotics (not native to Montana).

Cannabis

Family: Cannabaceae
Humulus lupulus, common hop
Cannabis sativa, marijuana

Elm
Family: Ulmaceae
Celtis occidentalis, common hackberry
Ulmus americana, American elm
Ulmus pumila, Siberian elm

Stinging nettles
Family: Urticaceae
Parietaria pensylvanica, Pennsylvania pellitory
Urtica dioica, stinging nettle

Further reading

See also
 List of dicotyledons of Montana

Notes

Montana